The Gathering is a compilation album of Canadian artists in world music genres, released in 1991. Produced by former Parachute Club drummer Billy Bryans, the album featured artists he had booked for the 1991 Ontario Place concert series World Beat.

At the Juno Awards of 1992, the album won the Juno Award for World Music Album of the Year.

Track listing

References

1991 albums
Compilation albums by Canadian artists
Attic Records albums
Juno Award for Global Music Album of the Year albums